is a 2012 Japanese film directed by Sion Sono. Following a nuclear accident, nearby residents are forced to evacuate. A pregnant evacuee fears that she is still at risk from radiation even in her new location, while her in-laws refuse to leave their home.

Plot
An earthquake hits Japan causing a nuclear power plant to explode. In a small village fictitiously called Nagashima, a couple of farmers lead a most peaceful existence and cling to their property despite the instructions of the authorities who define a security perimeter cutting the locality in two. Son and daughter-in-law leave for another village, where Izumi, the young wife, discovers that she is going to give birth to a child. A film evoking the nuclear disaster in Fukushima on March 11, 2011.

Cast
Isao Natsuyagi
Naoko Otani
Jun Murakami
Megumi Kagurazaka
Denden

References

External links
Official website 

Films directed by Sion Sono
2012 films
Films about the 2011 Tōhoku earthquake and tsunami
Films about the Fukushima Daiichi nuclear disaster
Films about earthquakes
Films about nuclear accidents and incidents
Films about tsunamis
2010s Japanese films